Frank Harts (born May 30, 1979) is an American film, television, and theatre actor. He played George Murchison in the 2004 Tony Award-winning Broadway revival of A Raisin in the Sun opposite Sean Combs, Audra McDonald, Phylicia Rashad, and Sanaa Lathan. Harts has played supporting roles in several films, including the film Home directed by Jono Oliver, which was nominated for an NAACP Image Award for Outstanding Directing in a Motion Picture in 2014. He played recurring character Deputy Dennis Luckey on the HBO series The Leftovers created by Damon Lindelof and Tom Perrotta. He also played recurring character Dale Christo on the Showtime series Billions. Harts is a graduate of The Juilliard School.

Filmography

Film

Television

References

External links
 
 
 A Raisin in the Sun at IBDB
 NAACP Image Award

American male film actors
American male television actors
Living people
1979 births
Place of birth missing (living people)